The Afsarwala tomb complex consists of a tomb and mosque, located inside the Humayun's Tomb complex in Delhi, India. The mausoleum houses the tomb of an unknown person. The tomb, together with other structures, forms the UNESCO World Heritage Site of Humayun's tomb complex.

Location 
The Afsarwala tomb is located east of the Arab Serai at the Humayun's Tomb complex in Delhi, India. The Afsarwala tomb is located south-east from the mosque.

Name and dating 
According to an explanation by the Archeological Survey of India the name "Afsarwala tomb" could derive from the Persian word afsar (افسر), which itself derives from the English word officer, making the building an "officer-wala's tomb", a grave for a military commander. A more recent theory points to the Persian tribal name Afsar, noting that several Afsars were employed at the early Mughal court, including one namebearer, who helped Humayun during his return and recapture of India in 1555. 

One of the graves inside the mausoleum contains the number 974, believed by the Archaeological Survey of India to indicate 974 A.H. (in the Islamic calendar), indicating that the mausoleum may have been built between 1566 and 1567.

Architecture

Mosque 
According to archaeological evidence, the mosque was built between 1560 and 1567. Located adjacent to the Afsarwala tomb, the mosque is built on the same raised platform as the tomb. The façade contains three arches, with red-painted spandrels, each arch enclosing its own alcove. Staircases to the terrace are located at the extreme two sides of the mosque.

Stucco lines the mosque's interior, with ceiling arches containing medallions. The soffit of the nave is painted stucco. The drum which sits underneath the dome of the mosque is octagonal on the outside, but square in shape internally. Red paint is used to decorate the drum.

There is only one dome and chhatri. Ram Nath opines that the plan of the mosque is nothing new and the themes are just replicas of previous mosques.

Tomb 
The Afsarwala tomb is built on the raised platform of the mosque. The mausoleum is built from grey quartz and lined with red sandstone and marble. A single cruciform chamber with a double dome is located inside the mausoleum. Externally, the mausoleum is octagonal in shape. Each side of the octagon contains an arch with a squared doorway, which opens into the inner chamber. Red sandstone is used to decorate the spandrels of the arches. The external dome rises from an octagonal drum and is crowned by a red sandstone lotus finial.

Gallery

References

Bibliography

External links
 UNESCO website

World Heritage Sites in India
Indo-Islamic architecture
Sandstone buildings in India
Tourist attractions in Delhi
Mausoleums in Delhi
Mosques in Delhi
Monuments of National Importance in Delhi